Percy Kelly may refer to 

Percy Kelly (artist), artist and footballer
Percy R. Kelly, lawyer and judge